SP9 may refer to: 
 USS Psyche V (SP-9), an armed motorboat that served in the United States Navy as a patrol vessel from 1917 to 1919
 3601 Velikhov (1979 SP9), an outer main-belt asteroid discovered on September 22, 1979